Helen Gordon may refer to:

 Elenor Gordon (Helen Orr Gordon, 1934–2014), Scottish swimmer 
 Helen Gordon (CEO), chief executive designate of Grainger plc
 Helen Gordon (bowls), Israeli lawn bowler